ICNC may refer to:
 Interdisciplinary Center for Neural Computation, an Israeli research centre linked to the Hebrew University
 International Center on Nonviolent Conflict, a non-profit institute involved with nonviolence strategy
 Isolated Congenital Nail Clubbing, a medical term
 Iranian Consortium of National Content, an Iranian consortium
 Information Communications Network LLC, a backbone network owner company in Mongolia.